A selfie is a self-photograph, a style of portraiture that became popular in the 2000s.

Selfie or selfies may also refer to:

 Selfie (TV series), a 2014 American sitcom starring Karen Gillan and John Cho
 Selfie (2014 film), a Romanian film
 Selfie (2018 film), a Russian film
 Selfie (2019 film), a French film
 Selfie (2022 film), an Indian film
 Selfie (album), a 2014 album by the Italian singer Mina
 "#Selfie" (song), a 2014 song by the American DJ duo the Chainsmokers, stylized "#SELFIE"
 "Selfies" (song), a 2014 song by the Scottish singer-songwriter Nina Nesbitt
 "Selfie", a 2015 song by the Serbian singer Milica Pavlović

See also
Selphie Tilmitt, a character in the video game Final Fantasy VIII